Robert Sampson Elegant (born March 7, 1928) is a British-American author and journalist born in New York City. He spent many years in Asia as a journalist. The Asian settings of all but one of his novels reflect that experience. He covered both the Korean and the Vietnam Wars, as well as four or five lesser conflicts. His latest novel, Cry Peace, is centered on the Korean War.

Career

Elegant holds degrees from the University of Pennsylvania (AB, Phi Beta Kappa); and Columbia University  (MA, Far Eastern studies, MS journalism, Distinguished Alumnus Award), as well as a diploma of proficiency in Chinese from Yale University. He has been a Pulitzer Prize traveling fellow (1951) and received an Edgar Allan Poe Special Award in 1967 for A Kind of Treason, among the best first mystery thriller novels of the preceding year.

He has, among other awards, received four prizes for best interpretation of foreign news by the Overseas Press Club of America. He was shortlisted for a Pulitzer Prize in international reporting three times, a finalist twice. He has been a visiting professor at the University of South Carolina and Boston University.

He has been a fellow of the Washington, D.C. American Enterprise Institute, the Berlin, Germany, Wissenschaftskolleg, Institute for Advanced Studies, and the Fairbank Center for Chinese Studies at Harvard University.

He briefed Richard Nixon and Henry Kissinger repeatedly on Asia in general, as well as China and Vietnam in particular.
He is proud of a handwritten note from the former president whose undeniably momentous masterstroke in foreign affairs was reopening contact with mainland China. That note reads: "Dear Robert, You are my favorite China expert. Richard Nixon"

Elegant is the patron of the Manchu Shih Tzu Society of Great Britain; he raises shih-tzu (Chinese lion) dogs and has been a devoted amateur sailor and owner of small craft for 50 years.

He now lives in London and Italy.  He frequently travels, mainly to the Far East. He speaks, reads, and writes Chinese and Japanese, having studied both the classical and modern languages, as well as German, Italian, and some Indonesian.

His articles have been published in hundreds of newspapers and scores of weekly, biweekly, and monthly journals across the world, and his books have been published in a number of languages in 20 countries.

In Delhi, India on April 16, 1956, painter Moira Clarissa Brady became his wife. She died of cancer January 19, 1999. Elegant married author and editor Ursula Rosemary Righter (née Douglas) on May 10, 2003, in Italy.

His children are Victoria Ann, a gynecological and pharmacological physician, and Simon David Brady, journalist and novelist.

Bibliography

Nonfiction
 
 The Dragon's Seed, St. Martin's (1959)
 The Center of the World, Doubleday (1964) (revised edition by Funk in 1968)
 Mao's Great Revolution, World Publishing (1971)
 China's Red Masters: Political Biographies of the Chinese Communist Leaders, Greenwood Press (1971) (First reprint)
 Mao vs. Chiang: The Battle for China, Grosset & Dunlap (1972)
 The Great Cities: Hong Kong, Time-Life (1977)
 Pacific Destiny: Inside Asia Today, Crown (1990)

Fiction
 A Kind of Treason, Holt (1966)
 The Seeking, Funk (1969)
 Dynasty, McGraw (1976)
 Manchu, McGraw (1979)
 Mandarin, Simon & Schuster (1983)
 White Sun, Red Star, Hamish Hamilton (1986) (published as From a Far Land by Random House in 1987)
 Bianca, Sinclair-Stevenson (1992) (St Martin's also published it in 1995)
 The Everlasting Sorrow, Reed International (1994)
 Last Year in Hong Kong: A Love Story, Morrow (1997)
 The Big Brown Bears, Hale (1998)
 Cry Peace, Hale (2005)

Sources
 "Robert (Sampson) Elegant," Contemporary Authors Online, entry updated 4 April 2001.

Notes

1928 births
Living people
20th-century American novelists
20th-century American male writers
21st-century American novelists
21st-century American male writers
American male novelists
American reporters and correspondents
American war correspondents
Columbia University Graduate School of Journalism alumni
Quadrant (magazine) people
University of Pennsylvania alumni
Yale University alumni
20th-century American non-fiction writers
21st-century American non-fiction writers
American male non-fiction writers
American emigrants to the United Kingdom